The winners of the Vancouver Film Critics Circle Award for Best Canadian Film are listed below:

Winners

2000s

2010s

2020s

References

Vancouver Film Critics Circle Awards
Awards for best film